John Reese may refer to:

People
John Reese (baseball) (1895–?), outfielder in the Negro leagues
John Reese (cricketer) (1877–1971), New Zealand cricketer
John D. Reese (1855–1931), American Major League Baseball trainer
John H. Reese (1910–1981), American author of Western fiction
John N. Reese Jr. (1923–1945), American posthumous Medal of Honor recipient in World War II
John P. Reese (born 1953), American money manager and financial columnist 
John Earl Reese (1939–1955), murdered African American teenager
John Terence Reese (1913–1996), British bridge player and writer
John Reese, American musical producer for the Uproar Festival

Characters
John Reese (Person of Interest), a main character from the television series Person of Interest
John Connor, alias in television series Terminator: The Sarah Connor Chronicles

See also
John Rees (disambiguation)
John Reese Kenly (1818–1891), American lawyer and Union general in the American Civil War
John Rhys (1840–1915), scholar
John Rhys-Davies (born 1944), Welsh actor